The Divided Trail: A Native American Odyssey is a 1978 American short documentary film directed by Jerry Aronson. It was nominated in 1978 for an Academy Award for Best Documentary Short. It lost to The Flight of the Gossamer Condor.

References

External links

1978 films
1978 documentary films
1978 short films
American short documentary films
1970s short documentary films
American independent films
Documentary films about Native Americans
1978 independent films
1970s English-language films
1970s American films